Podolí is a municipality and village in Brno-Country District in the South Moravian Region of the Czech Republic. It has about 1,500 inhabitants.

Notable people
Květa Legátová (1919–2012), writer

Twin towns – sister cities

Podolí is twinned with:
 Ay-sur-Moselle, France
 Kuchyňa, Slovakia

References

Villages in Brno-Country District